Archduchess Margarete Sophie of Austria (Margarete Sophie Marie Annunciata Theresia Caroline Luise Josephe Johanna; 13 May 1870 – 24 August 1902) was a member of the House of Habsburg and an Archduchess of Austria by birth. She was married to Duke Albrecht of Württemberg.

Family
Margarete Sophie was born at Artstetten Castle, Artstetten-Pöbring, the fourth and youngest child and only daughter of Archduke Karl Ludwig of Austria and his second wife Princess Maria Annunciata of Bourbon-Two Sicilies. She was named for her father's first wife, Princess Margaretha of Saxony, and for her paternal grandmother, Princess Sophie of Bavaria. Her older brothers included Archduke Franz Ferdinand of Austria and Archduke Otto Francis of Austria.

Theresan Convent of Noble Ladies
As a young woman, Margarete Sophie was princess-abbess of the Theresian Royal and Imperial Ladies Chapter in Prague (1886-1893). The convent was located in the Hradschin Royal Palace, and was an educational foundation open only to high-born young women, who were required to prove that all sixteen of their great-grandparents were of noble birth. It was not unusual for the abbess to be chosen from among the archduchesses of the Imperial Habsburg family, though the abbess and all pupils were allowed to leave the order and marry.

Marriage and issue
Margarete Sophie married Duke Albrecht of Württemberg, eldest child of Duke Philipp of Württemberg and his wife Archduchess Maria Theresa of Austria, on 24 January 1893 in Vienna, Austria-Hungary. Margarete Sophie and Albrecht had seven children: 
Philipp Albrecht, Duke of Württemberg (1893–1975);
Duke Albrecht Eugen of Württemberg (born 8 January 1895 in Stuttgart; died 24 June 1954 in Schwäbisch Gmünd), who married Princess Nadezhda of Bulgaria (1899–1958), daughter of Tsar Ferdinand I, and had five children;
Duke Carl Alexander of Württemberg (born 12 March 1896 in Stuttgart; died 27 December 1964 in Altshausen), known as "Father Odo";
Duchess Maria Amalia of Württemberg (born 15 August 1897 in Gmunden; died 13 August 1923 in Altshausen), briefly engaged to Crown Prince George of Saxony;
Duchess Maria Theresa of Württemberg (born 16 August 1898 in Stuttgart; died 26 March 1928 in Eibingen);
Duchess Maria Elisabeth of Württemberg (born 12 September 1899 in Potsdam; died 15 April 1900 in Meran);
Duchess Margarita Maria of Württemberg (born 4 January 1902 in Stuttgart; died 22 April 1945 in Altshausen).

Margarete died in Gmunden on 24 August 1902, aged 32.

Ancestry

References

Sources

1870 births
1902 deaths
People from Melk District
House of Habsburg
Austrian princesses
Duchesses of Württemberg